Astroblepus chapmani is a species of catfish of the family Astroblepidae. It can be found in the Magdalena River in Colombia.

Although the patronym was not identified; Eigenmann mentioned a “Dr. F. M. Chapman” in a later (1942) publication, who was a traveling companion in South America; this may have been ornithologist Frank M. Chapman (1864-1945), American Museum of Natural History.

References

Bibliography
Eschmeyer, William N., ed. 1998. Catalog of Fishes. Special Publication of the Center for Biodiversity Research and Information, num. 1, vol. 1–3. California Academy of Sciences. San Francisco, California, United States. 2905. .

Astroblepus
Endemic fauna of Colombia
Fish of South America
Fish of the Andes
Freshwater fish of Colombia
Magdalena River
Taxa named by Carl H. Eigenmann
Fish described in 1912